Joy F.C. is a Lesotho football club based in Leribe. It is based in the city of Leribe in the Leribe District.

The team currently plays in Lesotho Premier League.

Stadium
Currently the team plays at the 1000 capacity TSL Ground.

References

External links
Soccerway

Football clubs in Lesotho